Joseph Laurent Maurice Courteau (February 18, 1914 – November 20, 1985) was a Canadian ice hockey goaltender. He played in the NHL for the Boston Bruins.
  
Courteau was in net for the full 60 minutes of the game on March 16, 1944 in which the Detroit Red Wings beat the Bruins 10-9.  At the time, the 19 goals scored by both teams was a modern NHL record for the most in a game.

Career statistics

Regular season and playoffs

External links
 

1914 births
1985 deaths
Boston Bruins players
Boston Olympics players
Canadian expatriate ice hockey players in the United States
Canadian ice hockey goaltenders
French Quebecers
Ice hockey people from Quebec City
New York Rovers players
Philadelphia Rockets players
Providence Reds players
Quebec Aces (QSHL) players
San Francisco Shamrocks (PCHL) players